Ed Carpenter is an artist specializing in large-scale public sculptures made of glass. His work can be found in conference centers, libraries, and airports.

Early life and education

Carpenter studied architecture at the Rhode Island School of Design, where he studied with Dale Chihuly. He attended the University of California, Berkeley from 1968-1971.

Glass technique

Carpenter specializes in large-scale installations in glass. He is known for his technical innovation using cold-bent tempered glass, encapsulated glass elements, and programmed lighting elements. His work is often described as "architectural".

Works

While working with Dale Chihuly they created lead glass doors that are in the collections of the Corning Museum of Glass and the Toledo Museum of Art.

In 2019 he installed the first phase of a dichroic glass sculpture in the Portland Public Library, called "Mollie's Garden". The piece honored his mother, a library volunteer named Mollie Starbuck, who died in her 80's. His work "Aloft" is a 360 foot glass sculpture in the Wichita Dwight D. Eisenhower National Airport lobby and was featured as an event by the Wichita Art Museum on November 18, 2021.

He created a lobby sculpture for the Meydenbauer Convention Center in Bellevue, Washington; a large (17 meters x 18 meters x 6.5 meters) work for the Morgan Library at Colorado State University (commissioned by the Colorado Council on the Arts); and glass windows for the Christian Theological Seminary in Indianapolis, Indiana.

Other works include the Flying Bridge between buildings at Central Washington University, an installation at the Hokkaido Sports Center, and a large sphere for the atrium of Carlson school. He also created an outdoor sculpture for the Broadway pumphouse.

Personal life

Carpenter lives and has his studio in Portland, Oregon.

Writings

References

External links
Ed Carpenter's official web site

Year of birth missing (living people)
Living people
Artists from Portland, Oregon
Glass architecture
American glass artists
Rhode Island School of Design alumni
University of California, Berkeley alumni